Taylor Bachrach  (born 1978) is a Canadian politician who was elected to represent the riding of Skeena—Bulkley Valley in the House of Commons of Canada in the 2019 Canadian federal election. Prior to his election in the House of Commons, he served as the mayor of Smithers, British Columbia from 2011 to 2019 and as a municipal councillor in the Village of Telkwa from 2008 to 2011.

Bachrach owned a communications business, Bachrach Communications. He also worked as Communications Director for the Sierra Club of Canada BC Chapter.

Personal life 
Bachrach and his wife, Michelle, have two daughters. They live in Smithers.

Federal politics

After securing election in the 2019 Canadian federal election, Bachrach was named as the NDP critic for Infrastructure and Communities in the 43rd Canadian Parliament.

After his re-election in the 2021 Canadian federal election, Bachrach became the critic for Transport and deputy critic for Infrastructure and Communities.

On December 13, 2021, Bachrach tabled Bill C-210, the Right to Vote at 16 Act, which would amend the Canada Elections Act to lower the federal voting age in Canada from 18 to 16 years of age.

Electoral record

Federal

Municipal

References

External links

Living people
New Democratic Party MPs
Members of the House of Commons of Canada from British Columbia
Mayors of places in British Columbia
People from Smithers, British Columbia
1978 births